The Neukölln Ship Canal, or Neuköllner Schiffahrtskanal, is a  long canal in Berlin, Germany. It connects with the Landwehr Canal at its northern end, and with the Teltow Canal and the Britz Canal at its southern end.

The canal has a single lock, the Schleuse Neukölln, towards its southern end. The lock rises from the level of the Landwehr Canal to that of the Teltow and Britz canals.

References

Canals in Berlin
Buildings and structures in Neukölln
Canals opened in 1913
1913 establishments in Germany
CNeukolln